is an Echizen Railway Mikuni Awara Line railway station located in the city of Fukui, Fukui Prefecture, Japan.

Lines

Station layout
The station consists of two opposed side platforms enclosed by the Keifuku Nisei-Fukui Building, with a Mitsuwa home improvement center as the main tenant. The station is staffed.

Adjacent stations

History
On September 1, 1942 the Keifuku Electric Railway merged with Mikuni Awara Electric Railway. Operations were halted from June 25, 2001. The station reopened on September 1, 2007 as an Echizen Railway station under its present name.

Surrounding area
This station serves the national University of Fukui. There are also many apartments, pensions, student guesthouses and dormitories nearby, as well as shops and private residences.
Many other schools educational institutions are located nearby, including Fukui Prefectural Commercial Senior High School, Keishin Senior High School, and Fukui University of Technology.
Other points of interest include:
Fukui Kentoku Post Office
Fukujinkai Hospital
Hinode Ryokan

See also
 List of railway stations in Japan

External links

  

Railway stations in Fukui Prefecture
Railway stations in Japan opened in 1928
Mikuni Awara Line
Fukui (city)